Xenospadicoidaceae is a family of fungus first described in 2017. Its parent taxon, Xenospadicoidales, is a monotypic order in the class Sordariomycetes.

Species 
The following genera are accepted within Xenospadicoidaceae:

 Calyptosphaeria (4 species)
 Lentomitella (13)
 Neospadicoides (3)

 Spadicoides (58)
 Torrentispora (9)

References

Further reading 

 

Sordariomycetes